Kangra painting (Hindi: कांगड़ा चित्रकारी) is the pictorial art of Kangra, named after the Kangra State, a former princely state of Himachal Pradesh, which patronized the art. It became prevalent with the fading of Basohli school of painting in mid-18th century, and soon produced such a magnitude in paintings both in content as well as volume, that the Pahari painting school, came to be known as Kangra paintings.

Though the main centres of Kangra paintings are Guler, Basohli, Chamba, Nurpur, Bilaspur and Kangra. Later on this style also reached Mandi, Suket, Kullu, Arki, Nalagarh and Tehri Garhwal (represented by Mola Ram), and now are collectively known as Pahari painting, covering the style that was patronized by Rajput rulers between the 17th and 19th centuries.

Pahari paintings, as the name suggests, were paintings executed in the hilly regions of India, in the sub-Himalayan state of Himachal Pradesh. It is in the development and modification of Pahari paintings, that the Kangra School features. Under the patronage of Maharaja Sansar Chand (c.1765–1823), it became the most important center of Pahari painting.

To see some of these masterpieces one can visit the Maharaja Sansar Chand Museum, adjoining the Kangra Fort in Kangra Himachal, founded by the erstwhile Royal Family of Kangra.

History

This great art originated in Guler State, a small hill state in the Lower Himalayas in the first half of the 18th century when a family of Kashmiri painters trained in Mughal painting Style sought shelter at the court of Raja Dalip Singh (r. 1695–1741) of Guler. The rise of Guler Paintings started in what is known as the Early phase of Kangra Kalam. The new arrivals mingled with the local artists and were greatly influenced by the atmosphere of the hills. Instead of painting flattering portraits of their masters and love scenes, the artistes adopted themes of eternal love between Radha and Krishna. The paintings were naturalistic and employed cool, fresh colors. The colors were extracted from minerals, vegetables, and possessed enamel-like luster. Verdant greenery of the landscape, brooks, springs were the recurrent images on the miniatures.

Nainsukh (1710–1778), succeeded by two generations of his family workshop, introduced a distinctive style that combined Mughal elements with personal innovations.

This style reached its zenith during the reign of Maharaja Sansar Chand Katoch (r.1776–1824) who was a great patron of Kangra art. Being a liberal patron, the painters working at his atelier received large commissions while others accepted a permanent settlement in the form of lands. Maharaja Sansar Chand was an ardent devotee of Krishna and used to commission artists to paint subjects based on the loves and life of Krishna.

The Guler-Kangra art is the art of drawing and the drawing is precise and fluid, lyrical, and naturalistic. In these styles, the faces are well modeled and shaded so judiciously that they possess almost porcelain-like delicacy.

Themes

The focal theme of Kangra painting is Shringara rasa. The subjects are seen in Kangra painting exhibit the taste and the traits of the lifestyle of the society of that period. Bhakti cult was the driving force and the love story of Radha and Krishna was the main source of spiritual experience, which was also the base for the visual expression. Bhagavata Purana and the love poems Gita Govinda by Jayadeva were the most popular subjects dealing with the legends and the amorous plays of Radha and Krishna symbolizing the soul’s devotion to God. In some miniatures, the blue-god Krishna is seen dancing in the lush woodlands and every maiden’s eye is drawn to him. Krishna subjects, known commonly as Krishna-Lila predominate, while the themes of love, inspired by the Nayaks and nayikas and baramasa enjoyed great favor. The sentiment of love remained the inspiration and the central theme of Pahari painting. The Sat Sai depictions of the legendary lovers, on the other hand, were set against an architectural background with walls, balconies, and windows. Kangra paintings influenced by the Bhagavad Purana portrayed incidents from the life of the young Krishna, against the Brindavan forest or river Yamuna. The other popular themes were the stories of Nala and Damayanti, and those from Keshavdas's Baramasa.

Features of Kangra painting

One striking feature of Kangra paintings is the verdant greenery it depicts. The style is naturalistic, and great attention is paid to detail. The foliage depicted is vast and varied. This is made noticeable by using multiple shades of green. The Kangra paintings feature flowering plants and creepers, leafless trees, rivulets, and brooks.

The Kangra artists adopted various shades of the primary colors and used delicate and fresher hues. For instance, they used a light pink on the upper hills to indicate distance.

Kangra paintings depict the feminine charm in a very graceful manner. Facial features are soft and refined. The female figures are exceptionally beautiful.

Later Kangra paintings also depicted nocturnal scenes, and storms, and lightning. The paintings were often large and had complex compositions of many figures and elaborate landscapes. Towns and house clusters were often depicted in the distance.

The Kangra painters used colors made of vegetable and mineral extracts. They employed cool and fresh colors. Kangra paintings are known for the lyrical blending of form and color.

The Kangra Arts Promotion Society an NGO at Dharamshala Himachal Pradesh is working for the promotion of this art which is on the verge of extinction today. This NGO is running a school to train young boys and girls in this art. It also runs a workshop where genuine Kangra Paintings are made on traditional handmade paper using only mineral and vegetable colors.

See also
Rajput Painting
Basohli Painting
Indian painting
Madhubani painting
Mughal painting
Sikh art and culture

Further reading
 Kangra Painting, by William George Archer. Published by Faber and Faber, 1956.
 (see index: p. 148-152)
 Centres of Pahari Painting, by Chandramani Singh. Published by Abhinav Publications, 1982. .
 Kangra Paintings on Love, by  M S Randhawa. Publications Division. 1994. .

References

External links

 Kangra Arts Promotion Society
 Geometry of Kangra Paintings
 Classical – Kangra – Jayadeva Goswami's Gita-Govinda
 Kangra painting history

Kangra, Himachal Pradesh
Schools of Indian painting
Culture of Himachal Pradesh
Indian painting